Mounir Fekih (born 20 April 1993) is an Algerian footballer who plays for USM El Harrach in the Algerian Ligue Professionnelle 2 as a forward.

References

External links

1993 births
Living people
Association football forwards
Algerian footballers
USM Blida players
21st-century Algerian people